Zan in Iran may refer to:
 Zan, Kurdistan
 Zan, Lorestan
 Zan, Tehran

See also
 Zhan, Iran (disambiguation)